Horsford is a surname, and may refer to:

Alfred Horsford (1818–1885), British Army officer
Anna Maria Horsford (born 1948), American actress
Cornelia Horsford (1861–1944), American archaeologist
Cyril Arthur Bennett Horsford
Derek Horsford (1917–2007), British Army officer 
Eben Norton Horsford (1818–1893), American scientist
Jerediah Horsford (1791–1875),  American politician 
John Horsford (1751-1817), British soldier
Mary Gardiner Horsford (1824-1855), American poet
Sonya Douglass Horsford, American academic 
Steven Horsford (born 1973), American politician 
Tamla Horsford (died 2018), American murder victim
Walter Horsford (died 1898), English murderer